Byron Lowell Donalds (born October 28, 1978) is an American politician and financial professional serving as the U.S. representative for Florida's 19th congressional district since 2021. His district serves most of the heart of Southwest Florida, including Cape Coral, Fort Myers, Bonita Springs, Estero, and Naples. 

Born and raised in Crown Heights, Brooklyn, Donalds attended Florida A&M University and earned a Bachelor of Science degree in finance and marketing from Florida State University in 2002. 

Before entering politics, Donalds worked in the finance, insurance, and banking industries. A Republican, he was a member of the Tea Party movement and unsuccessfully ran for the U.S. House of Representatives in 2012. Donalds represented the 80th district in the Florida House of Representatives from 2016 to 2020.

Donalds was elected to Congress in 2020, defeating Democratic nominee Cindy Banyai. In the 2023 Speaker of the U.S. House of Representatives election, Donalds received enough Republican votes to deny Kevin McCarthy the speakership in the fourth through 11th rounds of voting.

Early life and education 
Donalds was born and raised in the Crown Heights neighborhood in the New York City borough of Brooklyn. One of three children, he was raised by his single mother. In 1996, Donalds graduated from Nazareth Regional High School in East Flatbush. He attended Florida A&M University and earned a Bachelor of Science degree in finance and marketing from Florida State University in 2002.

In 1997, Donalds was arrested for marijuana distribution; the charges were dropped as part of a pre-trial diversion program. In 2000, he pleaded no contest to a felony bribery charge as part of a scheme to defraud a bank. His record was later sealed and expunged.

Career 

Donalds began his professional career in 2003 as a credit analyst at TIB Bank. He was promoted to senior credit analyst in 2004, and later promoted to commercial credit manager, assistant vice president, and credit manager. Donalds left TIB Bank in 2007 and took a position as a portfolio manager at CMG Surety LLC. In 2015, he joined Wells Fargo Advisors as a Financial Advisor.

After Donalds became involved in the Tea Party movement, he was encouraged to run for office.

In 2012, Donalds was a candidate for the U.S. House of Representatives in Florida's 19th congressional district. He finished fifth of six candidates. In 2014, he was reported as a likely candidate for the U.S. House in Florida's 19th congressional district after Trey Radel resigned, but did not run.

Donalds was elected to the Florida House of Representatives in 2016. During his Florida House tenure, he chaired the Insurance and Banking Subcommittee.

U.S. House of Representatives

Elections

2020 

Donalds was the Republican nominee for Florida's 19th congressional district in the 2020 election, running to succeed retiring incumbent Francis Rooney. He won a crowded nine-way Republican primary by 770 votes over State Representative Dane Eagle, finishing just over the threshold to avoid a recount. Republicans have a 100,000-voter advantage over Democrats in registration, and Florida Gulf Coast University professor Peter Bergerson noted that the Republican primary is almost always the real contest for most races in the area. In August 2020, anonymous text messages were sent out to constituents in the 19th district claiming that Donalds was dropping out of the race. Donalds later clarified via tweet that he was not dropping out and called the messages "illegal". 

During his campaign, Donalds described himself as a "Trump supporting, gun owning, liberty loving, pro-life, politically incorrect Black man." He stated his support for economic freedom, clean water, nuclear power and decreased government involvement in health care. He opposed the Green New Deal.

In the November general election, Donalds defeated Democratic nominee Cindy Banyai. Donalds said he would focus on policy related to water quality in Southwest Florida. Upon his swearing-in on January 3, 2021, Donalds became the sixth person to represent this district since its creation in 1983 (it had been the 13th District from 1983 to 1993, the 14th from 1993 to 2013, and has been the 19th since 2013).

Tenure 
In late 2020, Donalds was identified as a participant in the "Freedom Force", a group of incoming House Republicans who "say they’re fighting against socialism in America".

In January 2021, Donalds voted to object to the certification of electors from Arizona and Pennsylvania in the 2020 presidential election.

Donalds was blocked from joining the Congressional Black Caucus.

Iraq 

In June 2021, Donalds was one of 49 House Republicans to vote to repeal the Authorization for Use of Military Force against Iraq.

Syria 
In 2023, Donalds was among 47 Republicans to vote in favor of H.Con.Res. 21, which directed President Joe Biden to remove U.S. troops from Syria within 180 days.

2023 Speaker of the House election 

On January 3, 2023, Donalds received one vote in the 118th Congress's first election for Speaker of the House, from Chip Roy. Donalds voted for Kevin McCarthy on the first two ballots, then for Jim Jordan on the third. On January 4, on the fourth ballot, Roy nominated Donalds for Speaker, and he received 20 votes. He was nominated by Lauren Boebert on the fifth ballot, and again received 20 votes. He was sequentially nominated by Scott Perry, Dan Bishop, Andy Biggs, Matt Rosendale, and Anna Paulina Luna on the sixth to tenth ballots. He was not nominated on the 11th ballot, but still received 12 votes. Donalds switched his vote back to McCarthy after House Republican leadership made many concessions to House Freedom Caucus members.

Committee assignments 

 Committee on Oversight and Government Reform
Subcommittee on Civil Rights and Civil Liberties
Subcommittee on Economic and Consumer Policy
 Committee on Budget
 Committee on Small Business
Subcommittee on Economic Growth, Tax and Capital Access
Subcommittee on Oversight, Investigations and Regulations

Caucus memberships 

 Freedom Caucus
Republican Study Committee

Electoral history

2016

2018

2020

2022

Personal life 
Donalds and his wife, Erika, have three sons. They live in Naples, Florida.

See also
 List of African-American United States representatives
 List of African-American Republicans

References

External links

Representative Byron Donalds official U.S. House website

 Byron Donalds for Congress
 
Florida House of Representatives - Byron Donalds
Byron Donalds on Getting Government to Work Again

|-

|-

 -->

1978 births
21st-century American politicians
African-American Christians
African-American members of the United States House of Representatives
African-American state legislators in Florida
American Protestants
Black conservatism in the United States
Candidates in the 2020 United States elections
Christians from Florida
Florida State University alumni
Financial advisors
Living people
Republican Party members of the Florida House of Representatives
People from Naples, Florida
Politicians from Brooklyn
Republican Party members of the United States House of Representatives from Florida
21st-century African-American politicians
20th-century African-American people
Tea Party movement activists